Robert Hanell (2 March 1925 – 14 March 2009) was a German conductor and composer.

Life 
Born in Tschoschl, Czechoslovakia, Hanell, who originally wanted to become a teacher of ancient languages, took private music lessons with H. Zitterbart in Teplice, where he worked as répétiteur and choir conductor from 1943. In 1952 Hanell became municipal music director in Görlitz, before he was appointed first Kapellmeister at the Komische Oper Berlin by Walter Felsenstein in 1955. In 1965 he took over as chief conductor of the Großes Rundfunkorchester Berlin. He was also a permanent guest conductor at the Berlin State Opera, the Leipzig Opera, the Semperoper and the Chemnitz Opera. Guest appearances have taken him to Munich, Hanover, Frankfurt, Prague and Warsaw.

On 2 September 1981, Hanell was awarded the Goethe Prize of the City of Berlin for his work as principal conductor of the Großes Rundfunkorchester Berlin and as permanent guest conductor of the Staatsoper.

Hanell died in 2009 in Fredersdorf-Vogelsdorf aged 84.

Work

Stage works 
 Die Bettler von Damaskus, 1944, 1947.
 Cecil, Chamber opera 1946
 Die Gnomenwette, Märchenoper 1948, 1949.
 Die Spieldose, Opera in 2 acts, libretto by Robert Hanell after the play by Georg Kaiser, Erfurt 1957
 Dorian Gray, Opera with 9 scenes with 8 interludes, libretto by Robert Hanell after Oscar Wilde, UA Dresdner Staatsoper 9 June 1962
 Oben und unten, UA Magdeburg 1964
 Esther, Opera in 2 acts, libretto by Günther Deicke, Premiere Staatsoper Berlin 10 Oct. 1966
 Griechische Hochzeit, UA Leipzig 31 May 1969
 Fiesta, UA Weimar 1974
 Reise mit Joujou, UA Landesbühnen Radebeul 9 Oct. 1976
 Babettes grüner Schmetterling, 1984

References

External links 
 
 
 

20th-century German composers
20th-century classical composers
German opera composers
German conductors (music)
1925 births
2009 deaths
Sudeten German people